Cardioglossa gratiosa is a species of frog in the family Arthroleptidae.
It is found in Cameroon, Equatorial Guinea, Gabon, possibly Central African Republic, and possibly Republic of the Congo.
Its natural habitats are subtropical or tropical moist lowland forests, rivers, swamps, and heavily degraded former forest.
It is threatened by habitat loss.

References

Cardioglossa
Taxonomy articles created by Polbot
Amphibians described in 1972